Prignano may refer to:

Places
Laureana Cilento,  Italian municipality of the province of Salerno
Laureana di Borrello, Italian municipality of the province of Reggio Calabria